Laurent Hénart (born 15 October 1968) is a French politician who is the president of the Radical Party. He was a member of the National Assembly of France and represented the Meurthe-et-Moselle department.

Before the Republicans' 2016 presidential primary, Hénard endorsed Alain Juppé as the party's candidate for the 2017 French presidential election. In 2019, he publicly declared his support for the incumbent president, Emmanuel Macron. Before the 2022 elections, he endorsed Macron for re-election.

References

External links
 

1968 births
Living people
People from Laxou
Politicians from Grand Est
Radical Party (France) politicians
Union of Democrats and Independents politicians
Radical Movement politicians
Deputies of the 12th National Assembly of the French Fifth Republic
Deputies of the 13th National Assembly of the French Fifth Republic
Mayors of Nancy, France
Sciences Po alumni